Keith Anderson (born January 12, 1968) is an American country music artist. Before signing to a record deal, Anderson was one of several co-writers on "Beer Run (B Double E Double R-U-N)", a duet by Garth Brooks and George Jones, released in late 2001. Anderson was signed as a recording artist to Arista Nashville in 2004. His debut single "Pickin' Wildflowers" was released that year, as the lead-off track from his debut album Three Chord Country and American Rock & Roll. Counting "Pickin' Wildflowers", the album produced a total of four hit singles on the Billboard Hot Country Songs charts, and was certified gold by the RIAA.

In addition to his own material, Anderson co-wrote Big & Rich's single "Lost in This Moment", a Number One hit on the country music charts in mid-2007. Anderson switched to the Columbia label in 2007, and his second album, C'mon!, was released on August 5, 2008. The second single from the album, "I Still Miss You", became his first Top 5 country hit.

His latest release is a six-song EP album titled I'll Bring the Music; it was released May 12, 2015.

Early life
While growing up in Miami, Oklahoma, he played sports during middle and high school, and began his music career by playing in a band at church. After graduating from high school, he attended Oklahoma State University, where he was a member of Delta Tau Delta fraternity. During his college career, he obtained a degree in engineering. He also played baseball during his college years, and was approached by the Kansas City Royals. After a shoulder injury ended his pursuit of a professional baseball career, Anderson tried bodybuilding and placed second in the Mr. Oklahoma competition.

Musical career
After graduating, he accepted a position with an engineering firm in Dallas, Texas. A year and a half later, he resigned to pursue a career in music. He attended clubs at night, began writing songs, and began learning guitar from his brother, Brian.

In Dallas, he auditioned for Grapevine Opry, a show that had produced other country stars in the past. He performed on the show for three years, before performing at the Texas State Fair and Six Flags.

Due to financial difficulties, he was forced to find additional work, as a landscaper and as a personal trainer. He also enrolled in the physical therapy program at University of Texas. One month before starting, he decided to put his education on hold, and began producing his first CD. He said, "The month before I started, I thought, 'Wait a minute. This is going to be a whole bunch of commitment. If I'm ever going to do music, I need to go for it 100%. NOW. Physical therapy will always be there, and my engineering degree will always be there.'"

After recording his CD in Nashville, he began marketing it to radio stations. In 2000, he put together a band. His first hit as a songwriter came in 2001, when Garth Brooks and George Jones recorded "Beer Run (B Double E R-U-N)", which Anderson co-wrote with several other writers, including George Ducas. He opened for Montgomery Gentry in 2002, and performed at many events, where he earned his recording deal with Arista Nashville. Since then, he has written songs for Gretchen Wilson, as well as Big & Rich's Number One single "Lost in This Moment".

2004–2006: Three Chord Country and American Rock and Roll
In 2004, Anderson signed to Arista Nashville. His debut album, entitled Three Chord Country and American Rock & Roll, produced chart singles in "Pickin' Wildflowers", "XXL", and "Every Time I Hear Your Name". After the latter, the title track was remixed by Mark Hudson with Aerosmith lead singer Steven Tyler as a guest vocalist. After it failed to chart, "Podunk" was released as the album's final single and peaked at number 34.

2007–2009: C'mon!
Anderson released a song called "Sunday Morning in America" in early 2007 as the lead-off single to a second album for Arista. This song peaked at No. 28, however, and the album was delayed. Later the same year, Anderson switched from Arista Nashville to Columbia Records Nashville. His first single for the label, "I Still Miss You", was released in 2008 and became his third Top Ten hit. It was the lead-off single to his second album C'mon!, released in August 2008, and "Sunday Morning in America" was included on it, as well as his own rendition of "Lost in This Moment" and a cover of Foster & Lloyd's "Crazy Over You". The album's third single, "Somebody Needs a Hug", peaked at No. 46. The fourth single, "She Could've Been Mine", peaked at No. 56 in early 2009. Anderson parted ways with Columbia Nashville in October of that year.

2010–present: I'll Bring the Music
Since 2010, Anderson has recorded and released a few tracks, via his fan club on his official website. Those songs include "Wild Girls" and the underground hit "Your Town for Now". In May 2014, Anderson released the single "I'll Bring the Music" which received airplay on The Highway.

Anderson released a six-song EP album titled I'll Bring the Music on May 12, 2015, via iTunes and Amazon. He also released a full-length album of the same name available at his website and his shows in 2014.

Personal life
Anderson married Lauren Woodruff in December 2010, after ten years of dating. They welcomed a daughter, Crozle J. Anderson, on October 5, 2011, and a son Jaxon born November 2013. Keith was divorced in 2017.

Discography

Studio albums

Extended plays

Singles

Music videos

References

External links
Keith Anderson Official Website

1968 births
Living people
People from Miami, Oklahoma
American country singer-songwriters
American male singer-songwriters
Columbia Records artists
Country musicians from Oklahoma
Arista Nashville artists
Singer-songwriters from Oklahoma